Quadruple glazing (quadruple-pane insulating glazing) is a type of insulated glazing comprising four glass panes, commonly equipped with low emissivity coating and insulating gases in the cavities between the glass panes. Quadruple glazing is a subset of multipane (multilayer) glazing systems. Multipane glazing with up to six panes is commercially available.

Multipane glazing improves thermal comfort (by reducing downdraft convection currents adjacent to the windowpane), and it can reduce greenhouse gas emissions by minimising heating and cooling demand. Quadruple glazing may be required to achieve desired energy efficiency levels in Arctic regions, or to allow for higher glazing ratios in curtain walling without increasing winter heat loss. Quadruple glazing allows building glazing elements to be designed without modulated external sun-shading, given that the low thermal transmittance of having four or more glazing layers enables solar gain to be adequately managed directly by the window glazing itself. In Nordic countries, some existing buildings with triple glazing are being upgraded to glazing with four or more layers.

Features 

With quadruple glazing, the center-of-panel U-value (Ug) of 0,33 W/(m2K) [R-value 17] is readily achievable. With six-pane glazing, a Ug value as low as 0,24 W/(m2K) [R-value 24] was reported. This brings several advantages, such as:

 Energy efficient buildings without modulated sun shading The desired overall window thermal transmittance value of lower than about 0,4 W/(m2K) is possible without having to depend on modulated external shading.  A study by Svendsen et al. showed that at such low window U-values, glazing with moderate solar gain performs comparably to glazing of comparable U-value with variable external shading and high solar gain. This is so because with improved overall U-values, a building's heating demand diminishes, to the point that wintertime solar heat gain alone may be enough to heat the building.

Pronounced seasonal-dependence of the solar gain Due to incidence-angle-dependent Fresnel reflections, the optical characteristics of multipane glazing, also notably vary seasonally. As the sun's average elevation varies throughout the year, the effective solar gain tends to be meaningfully less in the summer. The effect is also visible to an extent to the naked eye.

 Comfort for occupants When compared to traditional double-pane or triple-pane windows with mechanical or structural shading arrangements, multipane glazing enables easier viewing between indoor and outdoor environments. A low U-value maintains inside glass temperatures at a more uniform level throughout the year.  During the winter, downwards convection currents (downdrafts) are very small, thereby enabling people seated near such a multipane window to feel as comfortable adjacent to the window as they would feel if they were seated adjacent to a solid wall. However, occlusion or shading might still be wanted for purposes of privacy.

 Nearly zero heating building In 1995, it was predicted that with a glazing U-value of 0,3 W/(m2K) zero-heating building could be attained. It has also been shown that the heating demand might be decreased to nearly zero for glazed buildings with system U-values as low as 0,3 W/(m2K).  Theoretically, in the summer, the remaining cooling demand could be satisfied by photovoltaic generation alone, with the greatest need for cooling nearly coinciding with the strongest sunlight incident on solar panels. However, in practice, temporal lags between cooling demand and the output from solar panels could occur due to factors such as ambient humidity and the need for dehumidification, as well as the thermal inertia of the building and its contents.

Engineering 

Multipane glazing is often designed with thinner intermediate glass panes in order to save weight. To prevent intermediate panes from thermal stress cracking it is sometimes required to use heat-strengthened glass. With more than three glass panes, special care must be taken of the spacer and sealant temperatures as intermediate glass panes in contact with these glazing elements can readily exceed design temperature limits of respective materials due to solar radiation (irradiance) heating.

Solar irradiance heating of intermediate glass panes increases substantially with an increased number of glass panes. Multipane glazing must be carefully designed to account for the expansion of the insulating gases that are placed between the glass layers, because such gaseous expansion becomes an increasingly important consideration as the number of glass panes is increased. Special breather vents, as well as small vents communicating between the layer spaces, can be incorporated in order to manage this glass-bulging effect. Finite element analysis is often used to calculate appropriate glass sheets' strengths.

See also 

 Passive house
 Curtain wall (architecture)
 Window
 Passive solar building design
 History of passive solar building design

References

External links 

  quadruple glazing seasonal energy transmittance video
  6-pane glazing destructive test video
 Reflex - Q-Air multipane glazing
 EN 1279:2018 Glass in building — Insulating glass unit
 EN 16612:2019 Glass in building — Determination of the lateral load resistance of glass panes by calculation

Glass
Building materials
Energy efficiency
Heat transfer
Thermal protection
Building insulation materials
Low-energy building